Retaj Hotels & Hospitality is a Qatari real estate and hospitality company with a total of 10 hotels operating in Qatar, Turkey, the Comoros, and Saudi Arabia.

Retaj Hotels was established in Doha in 2004 and focuses on real estate development and project management, real estate services, and the hospitality business.

Retaj Hotels operates according to Islamic principles and has banned alcohol and smoking at its hotels.  The company refers to its hotels as “Islamic hotels.”

Owners and leaders
Retaj Marketing & Project Management, a multipurpose company that overseas Retaj Hotels & Hospitality, is owned by five Qatari investors. The five investors include:
 Directorate of Endowments at the Ministry of Religious Entwinements, Islamic Affairs
 Sheikh Eid Bin Mohammad Al-Thani Charity Association
 Al-Jazeera Islamic Company (one of Qatar Islamic Bank companies)
 Al Umaraa Company for Trading and Properties
 Iqar company for properties investments and development (a contributory company between Qatar Islamic Bank and Endowment)

Qatar
Retaj Hotels & Hospitality owns 6 hotels in Qatar, all of which are located in Doha.

The Retaj Al Rayyan Doha Islamic hotel is situated in Doha's Al Dafna business district and has 19 stories and 360 rooms. The hotel is a 4-star hotel.

Retaj Royale Doha is a 5-star hotel located near Corniche Street and has 15 stories and 108 rooms. Retaj Royale Doha offers has 4 restaurants along with a spa and indoor pool.

Retaj Inn is situated in the center of downtown Doha amid the commercial and business district. The hotel consists of 12 floors with 80 apartments.

Retaj Inn Marina is situated in the Pearl-Qatar island and consists of 250 apartments as well as 2 outdoor pools and separate fitness rooms for men and women.

Expansion
According to its strategy, Retaj hotels and hospitality has a various brands under its portfolio, Retaj Royale, a 5 star brand, Retaj Al Rayyan, being a 4 star brand, a Resort concept called Retaj leisure and resort, and recently they have started their plans to expand with their budget hotel concept under the name of Retaj INN.

United States and Europe 
According to the Gulf Times, Retaj is seeking to expand into the European and United States hospitality markets. Private sector resources are expected to invest $5 billion into European expansion. In March 2013, Retaj Group vice chairman Mohamed bin Johar al-Mohamed told Gulf Times reporters, “We are eyeing the market in mainland Europe as well…we know there are openings for us. We are already in negotiations for taking a start in London.” In the United States, Retaj is focused on acquiring existing hotel outlets.

Turkey
Retaj Hotels & Hospitality owns 2 hotels in Turkey, one of which is located in Istanbul and the other is located in Termal.

Retaj Royale Istanbul Hotel is located in the Istanbul Business District.

Retaj Thermal Hotel & Spa is located in Termal, Turkey near the larger city of Yalova. The hotel consists of 88 rooms along with a spa, restaurant, garden and café. The hotel was built with a “TRY 35 million investment in partnership with Turkish Hisar Karadag Group.”

In 2015, Balkans.com reported that Retaj Hotels & Hospitality plans to invest $700 million in Turkey over the next 2 years with plans to open new hotels in Istanbul, Bursa, Trabzon, and Ankara.

Comoros Island 
The Retaj Moroni Sports and Leisure Resort is located in the Comoros. The hotel consists of 55 rooms.

Saudi Arabia
Retaj Al Rayyan Mecca is a 4-star hotel located in Mecca, Saudi Arabia. The hotel has 22 stories and 670 rooms and suites as well as a restaurant, fitness center, and meeting rooms.  A report published by Trade Arabia stated that the Al Rayyan Mecca hotel constitutes the Retaj Group's first step towards its “expansion plan in the GCC, particularly in Saudi Arabia.”

References

External links
 Retaj Hotels website

2004 establishments in Qatar
Hospitality companies of Qatar